Canada's grand railway hotels are a series of railway hotels across the country, each a local and national landmark, and most of which are icons of Canadian history and architecture; some are considered to be the grand hotels of the British Empire. Each hotel was originally built by the Canadian railway companies, or the railways acted as a catalyst for the hotel's construction.  The hotels were designed to serve the passengers of the country's then expanding rail network and they celebrated rail travel in style.

Architecture

Many of the railway hotels were built in the Château style (also termed the "Neo-château" or "Châteauesque" style), which as a result became known as a distinctly Canadian form of architecture. The use of towers and turrets, and other Scottish baronial and French château architectural elements, became a signature style of Canada's majestic hotels.  Architects also used the style for important public buildings, such as the Confederation and Justice buildings in Ottawa.

In later years, the railway companies departed from the Château style for some of their properties, notably with the construction of Winnipeg's Royal Alexandra Hotel in 1906; the Palliser Hotel in Calgary, built in 1914; and the elaborate second Hotel Vancouver, designed in grand Italianate style, unlike any of the previous Canadian railway hotels.

History
Canada's first grand railway hotel, the Windsor Hotel in Montreal, opened in 1878.  Although it was not owned by a railway company, it was built to serve railway visitors from nearby Windsor Station.  Given its location next to Montreal's main train station, the Windsor served for years as the permanent residence of executives of both the Canadian Pacific Railway (CPR) and Grand Trunk Railway.

The railways' development role in the construction and operation of large hotels was inaugurated with Canadian Pacific Railway's opening of the Hotel Vancouver on May 16, 1888.  This was the first of three railway-owned hotels by that name in Vancouver. Two weeks later, the Canadian Pacific Railway officially opened the Banff Springs Hotel on June 1, 1888.  The president of the Canadian Pacific Railway, William Cornelius Van Horne, had personally chosen the site in the Rocky Mountains for the new hotel.  He envisioned a string of grand hotels across Canada that would draw visitors from abroad to his railway.  Van Horne famously remarked: "If we can't export the scenery, we'll import the tourists."  The original Banff Springs Hotel, of wooden construction, was destroyed by fire in 1926 and replaced by the present structure.

Canadian Pacific next built the Château Frontenac in Quebec City, which quickly came to be the symbol of the city.  It was designed to rival any hotel in Europe. Its elevated location overlooking the city also made it a readily identifiable landmark as viewed from passing trains as well as ships plying the waters of the Saint Lawrence River en route to or from Montreal. Place Viger followed in Montreal, followed by The Empress in Victoria, British Columbia, and the Château Lake Louise in Alberta. The largest of the railway hotels is the Royal York in Toronto, which opened in 1929.

The main competitor to Canadian Pacific, the Grand Trunk Railway, was not prepared to leave the field solely to its rival.  It also determined to build a chain of luxury hotels across the country, which it did in the château style. The GTR built the Château Laurier in Ottawa in 1912, with the Fort Garry Hotel in Winnipeg and the Hotel Macdonald in Edmonton following in 1913 and 1915 respectively.

The GTR was amalgamated into the Canadian National Railway (CNR) in 1920. During the decades that followed, the hotel divisions of CPR and CNR, Canadian National Hotels and Canadian Pacific Hotels, continued to expand their competing hotel chains across the country. The Queen Elizabeth Hotel in Montreal, built in 1958 over that city's Central Station, was perhaps the last true railway hotel built in Canada.  Both railways continued to open new establishments in subsequent years, although none had any connection to the railways, except through their ownership.

In 1988, Canadian Pacific acquired Canadian National Hotels. For the first time, many of Canada's railway hotels were operated by the same company. In 2001, Canadian Pacific Hotels was renamed Fairmont Hotels and Resorts, using the name of an American company it had purchased in 1999. Fairmont continues to operate most of Canada's landmark hotels (see Canadian Pacific Hotels).

Inventory
The majority of Canada's grand railway hotels were built by three railway companies, Canadian National Railway, Canadian Pacific Railway, and Grand Trunk Railway. However, a few railway hotels were built and operated by other companies. Great Northern Railway was the only American company that built a railway hotel in Canada, the Prince of Wales Hotel in Waterton, Alberta.

Canadian National Railway
The following are grand railway hotels built for Canadian National Railway, and its hotel division Canadian National Hotels.

Canadian Pacific Railway
The following are grand railway hotels built for Canadian Pacific Railway, and its hotel division Canadian Pacific Hotels.

Grand Trunk Railway
The following are grand railway hotels built for Grand Trunk Railway and its western subsidiary, Grand Trunk Pacific Railway.

Other companies
In addition to Canadian National Railways, Canadian Pacific Railways, and Grand Trunk Railways, several other companies built "grand railway hotels" in Canada. The Prince of Wales Hotel is the only grand railway hotel to be built by an American company, Great Northern Railway.

See also

Notes

References

Further reading

External links 
 

Canadian architectural styles
Architecture in Canada
Economic history of Canada
Heritage hotels